All My Friends Are Dead is an illustrated dark comedy book published by Chronicle Books in 2010. It was written by Avery Monsen and Jory John and illustrated by Avery Monsen.

An animated GIF of the first 10 pages of the book was posted on Tumblr and quickly became the most reblogged and liked post in Tumblr's history. The viral website was also reported in New York magazine.  It appeared on the bestseller lists of the San Francisco Chronicle, Boston Globe, and Los Angeles Times.

A sequel, All My Friends Are Still Dead, was released in 2012.

References

2010 books
Comedy books
Black comedy books
Chronicle Books books